Paul Friedman may refer to:

 Paul L. Friedman (born 1944), American judge
 Paul Friedman (announcer) (born 1968), sports commentator

See also
 Paul Freeman (disambiguation)
 Paul Freedman, American history professor
 Paul Friedmann (1840–c. 1900), German philanthropist and early Zionist